Mubarak Ahmad Khan is a Bangladeshi scientist who has been doing research into jute's commercial uses and possibilities. According to the science-based research database, Scopus, he is considered to be the leading scientist in the study of jute worldwide. He is currently serving as the Scientific Advisor of Bangladesh Jute Mills corporation (BJMC). Among his inventions are the Sonali Bag, Jutin, and helmets and tiles made from jute.

Life and career

Early life and education 
Mubarak Ahmad Khan was born in a Muslim family in Manikganj district in Bangladesh. He was one of five children of school teacher Muhammad Murshid Khan and Nurjahan. Mubarak Ahmad completed his bachelor's degree and master's degrees at Jahangirnagar University. In 1991, he completed a Ph.D. degree in polymer and radioactive chemistry and later earned post doctoral degrees from Germany, Japan and the United States.

Professional career 
In 1984, Mubarak Ahmad Khan started his professional career as a Scientific Officer in Radiation and Polymer Chemistry Laboratory, Bangladesh Atomic Energy Commission. During 1990–2000, he was a Senior Scientific Officer and from 2001 to 2009, he was Principal Scientific Officer and Group Leader in that laboratory. From 2009 to 2015, he was the Chief Scientific Officer and Director of Institute of Radiation and Polymer Technology, Bangladesh Atomic Energy Commission. From 2015 to 2017, he was served as a Director General in Bangladesh Atomic Energy Commission. Starting in 2017, he is acting as a Scientific Advisor of Bangladesh Jute Mill's Corporation and he has served as a consultant in many private companies in Bangladesh.

Working experience in eminent research institute 
In 1990, Khan was IAEA fellow in University of New South Wales, Australia. In 1995 and 2014 he was a DAAD fellow in Technical University in Berlin, Germany and Jacob University in Bremen, Germany. In 1997, he worked in "The Matsumae International Foundation (MIF)", Japan. In 2000, he was a visiting professor at Michigan State University, USA. In 2003, 2005, 2007, 2010 and 2014, he was Alexader von Humboldt fellow (AvH) in Fraunhofer Institute for Applied Polymer Research and University of Kassel, Germany. In 2017, he worked for the Japan Society for the Promotion of Science (JSPS), Kumamoto University, Japan.

Teaching experience in Bangladesh 
Mubarak Ahmed Khan has been a faculty member at institutions like Mirzapur College (1982–1984), Shahjalal University of Science and Technology (1991–2002), Mawlana Bhashani Science and Technology University (2010–2016) and from 2012 to present is an adjunct professor of the University of Dhaka.

He is a visiting professor of Daffodil International University and Islamic University of Technology, Bangladesh. He has supervised more than 300 M.Sc. students, 8 M. Ph. students and 20 Ph.D. students.

Scientific career 
Mubarak Ahmad Khan works on environmental science, material science, health care, agriculture and biological science. He is working on sustainable material and also working on nano-technology. He has invented biodegradable polybag (Sonali Bag) from jute fibre to remove plastic pollution. He work on deafferents type of composite materials, in this continuing he has invented Jute Reinforcement Corrugated Sheet (Commercial name is Jutin). He used to mix jute with polymer for the making of Jutin. He invented an advanced wound dressing material from cow bone, biodegradable PPE from jute with chitosan, biodegradable sanitary napkin from jute based superabsorbent, Natural Dye Sensitized Solar Cell l. He has invented natural plant growth promoter from prawn shell, liquate biofertilizer from textile effluent, etc. In 2016 he created non-harmful proteins as an alternative to harmful formalin for human body. He also invented numerous essential things with jute.

Biodegradable polybag (Sonali Bag) 
The Sonali Bag is a cellulose-based biodegradable bioplastic alternative to plastic bags, particularly polythene bags. The cellulose used in Sonali Bags is extracted from jute, a major vegetable fiber crop grown across the globe. "Sonali Bag" was named by Bangladesh Honorable Prime Minister Sheikh Hasina in 2017. The Sonali Bag (biopolymer) is made of natural ingredients like jute based cellulose, binder (a natural polymer), and vegetable color. This is a biopolymer without any plastic. So, the preparation method and instrument of the biopolymer is different then that traditional plastic.

Positive effect on environment of sonali bag 
Polyolefins like polyethylene and polypropylene are hydrocarbon hydrophobic polymers, resistant to peroxidation, biodegradation, highly resistant to hydrolysis, which is their main attribute in packaging, and not biodegradable. Nowadays their use has to be restricted and banned because they are not totally recyclable, biodegradable, compostable and eco-friendly so they pose serious ecological problems, toxic substance, contaminated foods and biological substance and serious health hazard and diseases.
The main aim of biodegradable, compostable, recyclable and environmental friendly packaging material is to imitate the life cycle of biomass, which includes conservation of fossil resources, water, and  production. The speed of biodegradation depends on temperature (50 to 70C), humidity, number and type of microbes. On the other hand, Sonali Bag is made from natural resources i.e., jute cellulose. It is designed to degrade upon disposal by the action of living organisms. So it is 100% biodegradable, compostable, recyclable and eco-friendly, it decomposes in the soil within 3–4 months and increases the soil fertility. This bag produces biomass e.g.,  etc. when it is buried as landfill. The production process is also suitable for the environment because all kinds of chemicals are nontoxic which are used during the production process and there is no smoke or fume produce during processing. It becomes ash when it burn, produces only carbon molecules. The roots of plants can easily penetrate into the bag during landfill, and there is no harmful effect on seed germination. The biodegradable packaging materials of Sonali Bag start to dissolve in water after 5 hours and are formed into biological foods.
Cellulose is renewable like carbon dioxide, water and sunshine. It is biodegradable; eco- friendly and cheap. It is very easy to modify it chemically and physically. The source of raw materials of cellulose is abundant in Bangladesh. So it is unnecessary to rely on petroleum to prepare polymer. People may raise this polymer by planting trees on earth, so the environmental problems will be no longer as severe as today.

Jute reinforced polymer corrugated sheet (Jutin) 
Jutin is a low cost and durable housing material. Jutin is a lightweight, ultra-strong, corrugated, and sustainable jute reinforced polymer composite. It is rustproof, soundproof, and saline water-resistance. Its low thermal conductivity provides more comfort in both summer and winter. Now Jutin is being manufactured in Khan's laboratory manually but a pilot-scale production facility is under construction collaborating with a private entrepreneur.

Publication
The world's various scientific research organizations publish documents on his work. In 1998, his name was published in the publication of 'Who's Who'. His publication list more than 800 and 20 book chapters. He has three research patents.

Awards and honors 
In recognition of his success in research on jute, Bangladesh Academy of Sciences gave the gold medal in 2010 to Mubarak Ahmed. Apart from this, he was awarded the National Jute Award in 2016, the Federation of Asian Chemical Society Award in 2017, National Environment Awards in 2019, MIT Solve Health Security & Pandemic Awards (2020).

References

Living people
Bangladeshi scientists
Academic staff of the University of Dhaka
1958 births